Safety Island is a small coastal island  east of Cape Daly, Antarctica,  south of Auster Islands, and  northwest of Landmark Point. Mapped by Norwegian cartographers from aerial photographs taken by the Lars Christensen Expedition, 1936–37. First visited in 1954 by an ANARE (Australian National Antarctic Research Expeditions) party led by R.G. Dovers, and so named because it was the nearest safe camp site to Scullin Monolith.

See also 
 List of Antarctic and sub-Antarctic islands

Islands of Mac. Robertson Land